Conasprella viminea, common name the wickerwork cone, is a species of sea snail, a marine gastropod mollusk in the family Conidae, the cone snails and their allies.

Like all species within the genus Conasprella, these cone snails are predatory and venomous. They are capable of "stinging" humans; therefore, live ones should be handled carefully or not at all.

Description
The size of the shell varies between 29 mm and 43 mm.

Distribution
This marine species occurs in the southern part of the Red Sea; off the Seychelles; Southern India; Sri Lanka; Western Thailand and off the Philippines.

References

 Puillandre N., Duda T.F., Meyer C., Olivera B.M. & Bouchet P. (2015). One, four or 100 genera? A new classification of the cone snails. Journal of Molluscan Studies. 81: 1–23

External links
 The Conus Biodiversity website
 Cone Shells – Knights of the Sea
 
 Specimen at MNHN, Paris

viminea
Gastropods described in 1849